This is a list of notable events in country music that took place in the year 1997.

Events
 July 12 — The song, "It's Your Love," by Tim McGraw and Faith Hill becomes the first song in 20 years to spend six weeks atop Billboard magazine Hot Country Singles & Tracks chart. The last song to do so was 1977's "Luckenbach, Texas (Back to the Basics of Love)" by Waylon Jennings. In that span, more than 750 songs had reached No. 1 on the country chart, a majority of them for just one week. The song sparked a renewed wave of songs that spend at least five weeks at No. 1, thanks in part to newer chart tracking methods and programming changes at country radio stations.
 August 7 - Garth Brooks plays a free concert at New York's Central Park, drawing over 1 million fans, with many dubbing it "Garthstock"; the special is broadcast on HBO, with its audience drawing 14.6 million. Billy Joel and Don McLean make special guest appearances.
 November 4 - Shania Twain releases her third studio album, Come On Over. The album becomes the best-selling country album of all time, best-selling studio album by a female act, best-selling album by a Canadian and ninth best-selling album in the United States and worldwide.

No dates
 Jimmie Rodgers is elected to the Rock and Roll Hall of Fame (as an early influence).
 Trisha Yearwood and LeAnn Rimes both record the song "How Do I Live" for the movie Con Air. Producers from the film ask Rimes to record it first but feel her version is not what they have in mind due to the performance itself and her young age. Yearwood then records the song and releases at the same time Rimes releases her song. Although Rimes' version peaked at No. 43 on the Billboard Hot Country Singles & Tracks chart, her version is shunned from the country charts yet reaches No. 2 on the Billboard Hot 100. Yearwood's version, meanwhile, peaks at No. 2 on the Billboard Hot Country Singles & Tracks chart and also makes the Top 40 of the Billboard Hot 100, as well as reaching No. 1 in Canada and No. 1 on the US Radio & Records chart.

Top hits of the year

Singles released by American artists

Singles released by Canadian artists

Top new album releases

Other top albums

Births
October 9 – Megan Moroney, singer of the 2020s ("Tennessee Orange").

Deaths
January 8 – Smiley Bates, 59, Canadian singer, songwriter, and multi-instrumentalist (Cancer).
January 21 — Colonel Tom Parker, 87, manager of prolific country singers Eddy Arnold and Hank Snow, comedian Minnie Pearl
June 19 — Bobby Helms, 62, singer who enjoyed his peak popularity in 1957; best known for "Jingle Bell Rock."
August 16 – Donn Reynolds, 76, singer-songwriter and country yodeler; established 2 yodeling world records.
October 12 — John Denver, 53, country crossover artist of the 1970s; also a singer and songwriter (plane crash)
December 21 — Amie Comeaux, 21, country singer from Louisiana (car accident)
December 31 — Floyd Cramer, 64, prolific session pianist (lung cancer)

Hall of Fame inductees

Bluegrass Music Hall of Fame inductees
Josh Graves

Country Music Hall of Fame inductees
Harlan Howard (1927–2002)
Brenda Lee (born 1944)
Cindy Walker (1915–2006)

Canadian Country Music Hall of Fame inductees
Family Brown
Sam Sniderman

Major awards

Grammy Awards
Best Female Country Vocal Performance — "How Do I Live", Trisha Yearwood
Best Male Country Vocal Performance — "Pretty Little Adriana", Vince Gill
Best Country Performance by a Duo or Group with Vocal — "Looking In the Eyes of Love", Alison Krauss & Union Station
Best Country Collaboration with Vocals — "In Another's Eyes", Garth Brooks and Trisha Yearwood
Best Country Instrumental Performance — "Little Liza Jane", Alison Krauss & Union Station
Best Country Song — "Butterfly Kisses", Bob Carlisle and Randy Thomas
Best Country Album — Unchained, Johnny Cash
Best Bluegrass Album — So Long So Wrong, Alison Krauss & Union Station

Juno Awards
Country Male Vocalist of the Year — Paul Brandt
Country Female Vocalist of the Year — Shania Twain
Country Group or Duo of the Year — Farmer's Daughter

Academy of Country Music
Entertainer of the Year — Garth Brooks
Song of the Year — "It's Your Love," Stephony Smith
Single of the Year — "It's Your Love," Tim McGraw and Faith Hill
Album of the Year — Carrying Your Love with Me, George Strait
Top Male Vocalist — George Strait
Top Female Vocalist — Trisha Yearwood
Top Vocal Duo or Group — Brooks & Dunn
Top New Male Vocalist — Kenny Chesney
Top New Female Vocalist — Lee Ann Womack
Top New Vocal Duo or Group — The Kinleys
Video of the Year — "It's Your Love", Tim McGraw and Faith Hill (Director: Sherman Halsey)
Vocal Event of the Year — "It's Your Love", Tim McGraw with Faith Hill

ARIA Awards 
(presented in Sydney on September 22, 1997)
Best Country Album - The Road Less Travelled (Graeme Connors)

Canadian Country Music Association
CMT Maple Leaf Foods Fans' Choice Award — Terri Clark
Male Artist of the Year — Paul Brandt
Female Artist of the Year — Terri Clark
Group or Duo of the Year — Farmer's Daughter
SOCAN Song of the Year — "I Do", Paul Brandt
Single of the Year — "I Do", Paul Brandt
Album of the Year — Just the Same, Terri Clark
Top Selling Album — The Woman in Me, Shania Twain
Video of the Year — "I Do", Paul Brandt
Wrangler Rising Star Award — Julian Austin
Vocal Collaboration of the Year — "Two Names on an Overpass", Duane Steele and Lisa Brokop

Country Music Association
Entertainer of the Year — Garth Brooks
Song of the Year — "Strawberry Wine", Matraca Berg and Gary Harrison
Single of the Year — "Strawberry Wine", Deana Carter
Album of the Year — Carrying Your Love with Me, George Strait
Male Vocalist of the Year — George Strait
Female Vocalist of the Year — Trisha Yearwood
Vocal Duo of the Year — Brooks & Dunn
Vocal Group of the Year — Diamond Rio
Horizon Award — LeAnn Rimes
Music Video of the Year — "455 Rocket", Kathy Mattea (Director: Steven Goldmann)
Vocal Event of the Year — "It's Your Love", Tim McGraw (featuring Faith Hill)
Musician of the Year — Brent Mason

RPM Big Country Awards
Canadian Country Artist of the Year — Paul Brandt
Best Country Album —  Calm Before the Storm, Paul Brandt
Best Country Single — "My Heart Has a History", Paul Brandt
Male Artist of the Year — Paul Brandt
Female Artist of the Year — Terri Clark
Group of the Year — Farmer's Daughter
Outstanding New Artist — Chris Cummings
Canadian Country Video — "My Heart Has a History", Paul Brandt
Top Country Composer(s) — Shania Twain

Further reading
Whitburn, Joel, "Top Country Songs 1944–2005 – 6th Edition." 2005.

Other links
Country Music Association
Inductees of the Country Music Hall of Fame

External links
Country Music Hall of Fame

Country
Country music by year